The House of Pacific Relations International Cottages is a complex of cottages in San Diego's Balboa Park, in the U.S. state of California. Built for the 1935 California Pacific International Exposition, they currently house 33 groups that "promote multicultural goodwill and understanding through educational and cultural programs". Groups that do not have their own cottage meet in the nearby Hall of Nations. The United Nations Association of San Diego operates separately out of the neighboring United Nations Building.

In 2021, the House of Pacific Relations International Cottages expanded, adding new cottages for Mexico, Panama, Colombia, Peru, India, Korea, Palestine, Turkey, and the Chamorros (indigenous people of the Mariana Islands).

Cottages
There are 33 cultures represented in the park represented by 32 cottages, and currently the park is in the process of building five more cottages representing nine more cultures. Prior to 1992, Czechoslovakia was represented as a single cottage, and since its partition, both cultures still share the same cottage. The current 32 cottages are:

House of Austria
House of Chamorros
House of China
House of Colombia
House of Czech and Slovak Republics
House of Denmark
House of England
House of Finland
House of France
House of Germany
House of Hungary
House of India
House of Iran
House of Ireland
House of Israel
House of Italy
House of Korea
House of Lebanon
House of Mexico
House of Norway
House of Palestine
House of Panama
House of Peru
House of the Philippines
House of Poland
House of Puerto Rico
House of Scotland
House of Spain
House of Sweden
House of Turkey
House of Ukraine
House of USA

References

External links

 
 

Balboa Park (San Diego)
Houses in San Diego
Houses completed in 1935
Spanish Revival architecture in California